KEWE (1240 AM) is a radio station licensed to the city of Kahului, Hawaii. It has a format called The Spirit 1240 AM/95.5 FM and is owned by Visionary Related Entertainment 11, Inc.

Its first license was granted by the FCC on February 10, 2015.

New 5,000 watt AM radio stations are unusual in 2015; frequencies on the AM band are scarce.

References

External links
 
 
 
 

EWE (AM)
Radio stations established in 2015
2015 establishments in Hawaii